The Irish Film Classification Office (IFCO) is the organisation responsible for films, television programmes, and some video game classification and censorship within Ireland. Where restrictions are placed by the IFCO, they are legally binding.

Prior to 21 July 2008, the office was branded as the Irish Film Censor's Office, and was previously known as simply the Film Censor's Office, or, in legal references, the office of the Official Censor of Films, which was the official title of the head of the office prior to that date. The head of the office is the Director of Film Classification.

Background

The Irish Film Censor's Office was set up in 1923, in accordance with the Censorship of Films Act, 1923. This law was amended in 1925, 1930, 1970, and 1992; and a substantial revision of the law occurred in the Video Recordings Act, 1989 which extended the remit of the office to the regulation of the video importation and supply industry. On 21 July 2008 the Civil Law (Miscellaneous Provisions) Act 2008 came into force. Section 70 changes some of the provisions with regard censorship of films in the State. Section 71 renames the Film Censor as the Director of Film Classification and consequent to this, the Irish Film Censor's Office became the Irish Film Classification Office.

Staff
The office consists of 21 staff members:
Acting Director of Film Classification – George Sinclair
Deputy Director – Vacant
10 Assistant Classifiers
Office Manager
6 Civil Servants from the Department of Justice
2 Projectionists

The 10 assistant classifiers are paid €168 per day and are entitled to claim expenses on top of this. According to a freedom of information request granted to the Irish edition of the Sunday Times the assistant classifiers claimed €306,683 in fees and €52,569 of expenses in 2007; €339,608 in fees and €49,898 of expenses in 2008; and €162,263 in fees and €21,401 of expenses for the first half of 2009. This equates to a payment of approximately €60 per film rated.

Certificates

Introduction and early history
Before 1965, there were no certificates and all films were tailored for a general audience, resulting in several bans and cuts (no doubt also due to extremely conservative societal standards). As of 2004, 2,500 theatrical films had been banned and about 11,000 cut, largely from before the overhaul.

Public controversy over the office's harsh methods came to a head in late 1964 - in 1963 alone, 31 films were rejected and 156 were cut. Critically acclaimed hits were no exception - Dr. Strangelove was cut, including Ripper's reference to Communists trying to "sap and impurify all of our precious bodily fluids" with fluoridated water, and Irish-shot medical drama Of Human Bondage was banned due to the heroine dying of syphilis. Even after the ban was overturned the following year, it still received an over-18's certificate with cuts - nude sculptures made by Auguste Rodin were removed from the background of the title sequence.
 
The appointment of a new Justice Minister, Brian Lenihan, in October 1964 coincided with this outrage. He met with the Cinema and Theatre Association in November to consider their views and even proposed to view recently banned films, including Of Human Bondage. On 28 November, Lenihan announced he'd be appointing a new Film Appeals Board and would be able to reform censorship without changing existing legislation - film correspondent Fergus Linehan pointed out that the 1923 Act explicitly supported age certification:

Lenihan announced the new Appeals board in January 1965, which came into effect on 18 January. Their main task was to begin enforcing limited certificates (alongside the general certificate), which were as follows, according to the Appeals Board chairman:
 Over 16
 Over 18
 Young persons under 12 years of age must be accompanied by an adult
 Educational

All bar the last are still enforced today under different names.

Cinematic certificates

The current cinematic certificates were announced in December 2004 at the European Conference of Film Classifiers in Paris and introduced on 1 January 2005. In November 2005, a public campaign was launched to raise awareness of them, including booklets, posters, stickers and an animated certificate produced by Brown Bag Films which drew attention to their relatively new website.

 G – General: Suitable for all
 PG – Parental Guidance: Suitable for children aged eight and older; parents are advised to accompany younger children.
 12A – Minimum age for admission is 12, but younger children can be admitted if accompanied by an adult (12PG between 1 June 2001 – 1 January 2005).
 15A – Minimum age for admission is 15, but younger children can be admitted if accompanied by an adult (15PG between 1 June 2001 – 1 January 2005).
 16 – Minimum age for admission is 16; younger viewers will not be admitted under any circumstance (introduced on 1 January 2005).
 18 –  Minimum age for admission is 18; younger viewers will not be admitted under any circumstance.

Home video certificates 
These were introduced on 1 September 1994:

 G – Fit for viewing by persons generally
 12RA – Fit for viewing by persons generally, but in the case of a child under 12 years, only in the company of a responsible adult.
 15 – Fit for viewing by persons aged 15 or more.
 18 – Fit for viewing by persons aged 18 or more.

From that date it was an offence to trade uncertified videos, which carried fines of up to £1000 and a maximum sentence of three years.  Additional rates came in at £180 per rental title, £80 per sale title and £20 per advert/trailer. This limited the market, especially for London distributors whose releases previously went to Ireland automatically.

In 1996, the 12RA certificate was officially replaced by PG and 12, although releases still used it into the 2000s.

The current certificates for home video formats such as DVD and Blu-ray that are issued are:

 G – General: Suitable for all
 PG – Suitable for general viewing, but parents are advised to watch with children younger than 12 years old.
 12 – Suitable for people aged 12 and over, and not to be supplied to someone below that age.
 15 – Suitable for people aged 15 and over, and not to be supplied to someone below that age.
 18 – Suitable for people aged 18 and over, and not to be supplied to someone below that age.

A retired certificate only used on home video is:

 12RA (no longer issued) Not suitable for people aged younger than 12 unless they view with an adult, and not to be supplied to someone below that age. The "RA" stands for "Responsible Adult". Retired around 2003 (officially replaced in 1996).

Standard cinematic-home video certification crossover 
This is the crossover, or change, in a certificate that will happen when a film which has been shown in cinemas, is released on home video, but this only applies if:

 There is no extra material (bonuses, trailers, etc.) which is not appropriate to the main feature, and would cause it to receive a higher certificate.
 The film has not been edited (material taken out, etc.) in a way which would cause the main feature to receive a lower certificate.

The standard crossovers are as follows:

Note: The certificate "12RA" did not have a corresponding cinematic certificate, and thus, did not have a standard crossover (certain 12A films received the certificate before it was withdrawn in the mid-2000s).

If the two rules above apply to a film's home video release, then, generally, it will be re-rated completely, but this does not mean certificates will always coincide for all formats, as occasionally (usually the DVD or Blu-ray) one edition will contain extra features while the other does not, causing one to be re-rated, and the other to take a Standard Crossover (for instance, a film which received a 15A certificate in cinemas may have received a 15 certificate on VHS but an 18 certificate on DVD; usually DVDs in these circumstances would carry a label on the reverse, informing viewers of this).

Home video

Until February 2009, the home video certificates were always the certificate surrounded by an octagon, followed by the words "FILM CENSOR'S OFFICE" and "OIFIG SCRÚDÓIR NA SCANNÁN", which were then surrounded by another, larger, octagon. The colours were cyan and white, but the order they appear in varied. Although the Office was renamed in July 2008, these continued to bear the old name until February 2009, when they were altered to read "IRISH FILM CLASSIFICATION OFFICE" and its Irish equivalent.

Video games
Unlike the BBFC in the UK, which prior to PEGI ratings becoming legally enforceable in the UK on 30 July 2012 rated video games that met certain criteria (such as very graphic violence), the Irish Film Censor's Office does not usually rate video games, leaving ratings to PEGI, unless the game's content is deemed prohibitable under section 3 (1) of the Act.

IFCO ratings for video games were introduced in 2001 and retired in 2003. Although the Silent Hill Collection was released in 2006, it contained re-releases of the second and third games, which were rated and released in 2001 and 2003 respectively.

Only 9 games have ever been submitted to and rated by the IFCO:

Despite the lack of legally binding ratings, most (if not all) video game retailers attempt to prohibit the sale of PEGI 18+ rated games to people under the age of 18, and prior to PEGI ratings the same was done with BBFC 18 ratings on games (the same packaging is usually used in games sold in Ireland as in the UK).

The only prohibition notice for a video game was issued for Manhunt 2 in 2007.

Appeals 
All decisions made with regard to certification, may be appealed for up to 6 months after the certificate is initially issued. An appeal is issued to the Classification of Films Appeal Board.

Works may also be submitted for re-classification after seven years since the original certification have passed (not an appeal per se, but rather seen as an update of classification based on current standards).

The most recent example of a (failed) appeal is The First Purge, which received an 18 certificate for strong bloody violence, sustained threat and disturbing scenes. The distributor (Universal Pictures) argued the case for a 16 certificate:

A. The Purge: Anarchy and The Purge: Election Year both received 16 certificates, for "frequent strong bloody violence, disturbing sequences, strong threat of sexual violence" and "strong bloody violence throughout" respectively. The distributor also mentioned the film's 15 certificate in the UK, which is consistent throughout the franchise.

After first being viewed on 15 June, it was re-viewed on 21 June when the Appeal Board stuck by the original decision.

Ger Connolly wrote back, explaining the decision in greater detail:

Previous appeals (excluding bans)

Refusals and bans
Films may be refused a certificate, e.g. on grounds of obscenity. Such films may not be shown in public cinemas or sold in shops, but are not ipso facto banned and have been shown at film festivals and art house clubs such as the Irish Film Theatre and Irish Film Institute. These may also show films which have not been submitted for certification, as the submission fee may be prohibitive if a film is screened only a few times at a small venue.

Prohibitions and revocations, with justification, are listed in the official gazette, Iris Oifigiúil, under the headings of PROHIBITION ORDER and REVOCATION ORDER.

Despite the recommendations in the 2000 review of certification that no further films be banned, bans are still occasionally issued, although usually overturned on appeal. Boy Eats Girl, a 2005 movie, was initially banned, with the option of a cut being provided to the producers. On appeal, the film was passed uncut, and granted a 15A rating, although the video certificate was raised to 18.

Movies which are never submitted for cinema release in Ireland are occasionally banned on attempted video releases, although only one such order was made in 2004, banning the pornographic Anabolic Initiations 5, with the appeals board upholding the censor's order. One order was issued in 2005, reiterating the ban on Deep Throat. The only order in 2006 banned the pornographic film Steal Runaway.

Films and videos prohibited by the Classifier/Censor include:

For a more detailed list with dates and justification, see Film censorship in the Republic of Ireland#Notable banned or cut films

Criticism 

Like many systems of entertainment classification, the IFCO has received criticism for several decisions they have made in the past. The board has been described as too zealous and conservative. Many titles that receive 15 certificates from the BBFC are rated 18 by the IFCO. DVD examples include Kick-Ass and Black Swan. Rarer cinema examples (which bypass the 16 rating) include Free Fire and You Were Never Really Here.

However, the IFCO are more lenient with strong language than the BBFC are, especially with very strong language (e.g. 'cunt'). Examples include Frost/Nixon and The Visitor receiving 15 certificates in the UK but PG's in Ireland despite the use of the stronger term 'motherfucker', and Gone Girl receiving an 18 in the UK but a 15 (on video) in Ireland despite four aggressive uses of 'cunt'. The 2014 documentary Red Army received a 15 in the UK but a 12A in Ireland for a single use of 'cocksucker' (although the video rating was upgraded to 15).

Three titles in particular drew criticism of the board: Election, But I'm a Cheerleader and Brokeback Mountain. All three were rated 18 in Ireland and 15 in the UK, although Brokeback Mountain was rated 16 for cinema release because the system is different than for video releases (it was only an 18 on video) - But I'm a Cheerleader was re-rated 15 in 2021.

The IFCO is established on a statutory basis and thus the appeals procedure is final. Thus, when a film or video game is banned, there can be no further appeal, but the work may be resubmitted after seven years.

See also 
 British Board of Film Classification - the equivalent body to the IFCO in the United Kingdom
 Censorship in the Republic of Ireland
 Film censorship in the Republic of Ireland
 Television content rating systems

References

Sources

External links
 – official site
 Irish Film Censors' Records - searchable calendar at Trinity College Dublin, mostly from period 1923-38

Motion picture rating systems
Mass media in the Republic of Ireland
Entertainment rating organizations
Censorship in the Republic of Ireland
Government agencies of the Republic of Ireland
Department of Justice (Ireland)